Luigi Cambiaso (29 January 1895 – 25 March 1975) was an Italian gymnast who competed in the 1920 Summer Olympics and in the 1924 Summer Olympics. He was part of the Italian team, which won the gold medal in the gymnastics men's team, European system event in 1920 as well as in the team competition 1924.

References

1895 births
1975 deaths
Italian male artistic gymnasts
Gymnasts at the 1920 Summer Olympics
Gymnasts at the 1924 Summer Olympics
Olympic gymnasts of Italy
Olympic gold medalists for Italy
Olympic medalists in gymnastics
Medalists at the 1924 Summer Olympics
Medalists at the 1920 Summer Olympics